Valen Low (born 14 January 1994) is a Singaporean professional armwrestler. He won the 2014 FitX Armwrestling Cup in Melbourne, Australia, as well as 1st and 2nd place, for right and left handed armwrestling respectively, at the Asia Armwrestling Championships 2014.

Low is the president of Singapore Armwrestling, the only armwrestling club in Singapore. He has attributed his success in the sport to training with the Singapore Armwrestling Team. He primarily trains with Desmond Lau Chee Loong, Tay Jia Jun (Tee Jun) and Joshua Park.
 Low have also promoted armwrestling via community events in the Nee Soon East region such as the Block party for Nee Soon East, Nee Soon East bursary awards 2016, Armwrestling promotions at Heart of God church. Corporate events such as Batman vs Superman run, OCBC Bank dinner and dance, Citibank dinner and dance was also part of his resume to promote the sport of armwrestling. He also co-organized the schoolyard armwrestling meet in 2015 and ITE college central armwrestling championships to further promote armwrestling for youth development. Low also spearheaded and organised the inaugural Singapore Armwrestling National Championships in 2021.

Biography 
Low began armwrestling at the age of 13, and developed a passion for the sport while attending Whitley Secondary School. He graduated with a Diploma with merit, multiple directors roll of honour and module prize award from Republic Polytechnic, majoring in Health Management and Promotion. He plans to win the World Armwrestling Federation's annual World Armwrestling Championship in the future.

Low has claimed to have been mocked and laughed at due to his passion for armwrestling, with his teachers describing his endeavours as "useless, a waste of time, nothing to achieve". His former form teacher once tried to ban him from armwrestling. However, he was not discouraged and devoted time to armwrestling training.

After Low's O-level examinations in late 2010, he travelled to Malacca, Malaysia to compete in his first armwrestling competition. He was eliminated in the quarter finals of the men's open, over 85 kg category. Throughout 2011, he competed at a junior level at competitions in Malaysia, placing first several times. In 2012, he competed in the men's middle weight category, again winning several competitions. Between 2011 and 2012 he won multiple Malaysia national titles. In 2013, he competed against Jian Jikan, Indonesia's top middleweight armwrestler, resulting in a 4–1 win for Low. In May 2017, he defeated Malaysia's number 1 armwrestler, 2015 Asian Champion, Arnold Classic Asia 2016 Champion, Joffey Jolly, attaining the top spot in the South East Asia armwrestling rankings. Low is currently ranked first in South East Asia for his respective weight class.

Armwrestling career highlights

Arnold Classic Australia
In 2014, Low was invited by the Australian Armwrestling Federation (AAF) to compete in the FitX Armwrestling Cup during the FitX Sport & Fitness Expo. He travelled to Melbourne for the competition using the $1000 prize he won from the Shin Min Armwrestling Challenge earlier that year. The FitX competition was Southeast Asia and Oceania's biggest armwrestling competition that year. Low and a fellow Singaporean, Melvyn Loh Hao Jie, competed in the under 80 kg category. Low won his weight category and emerged as the champion of the senior under 80 kg category. He ranked 1st out of the other 7 competitors from Singapore, Malaysia, Australia, and New Zealand. Following the competition, Low ranked first in the under 80 kg weight class in Oceania, and his teammate, Melvyn Loh, ranked second. In 2015, Low ranked 4th and in 2016 he placed 3rd.

Asia Armwrestling Championships 2014
In June 2014, Low, and fellow Singaporean, Desmond Lau, self-funded and competed in the 13th Asian Armwrestling Championships in Sendai, Japan from 27 to 29 June 2014. Valen competed in the under 21 years, 65 kg-70 kg left and right handed classes. He came in first in the right hand category and was the first runner up for the left hand category. So far, he has been the only Singaporean to achieve the title.

Pattaya International Armwrestling Championships 2014
Low along with Singapore arm wrestler, Tay Jia Jun, competed in the Pattaya International Armwrestling Championships on 6 September 2014. The event had more than 50 competitors in each category, hailing from countries such as Kazakhstan, Russia, Malaysia, Indonesia, South Korea, and the host country, Thailand. The competition also contained 3 different weight divisions: under 75 kg, 85 kg, and 85 kg+. Low achieved the title of second runner-up in the senior under 75 kg category by beating Russia's Dmitry Motorin, the first runner-up in the under 75 kg division of the 2013 Moscow Championships and the 8th-place winner of the right hand under 70 kg category in the highly regarded A1 Russian Open 2013. Low also achieved 6th place in the under 85 kg category and fellow Singaporean, Tay Jia Jun, attained 5th place in the senior under 85 kg category.

China International Armwrestling Championships
Low was invited to Shenzhen, China to compete in the China International Armwrestling Championships 2015. The event had competitors from Malaysia, Thailand, Philippines, South Korea, Taiwan and China. He came in first in the under 70 kg right arm category by defeating China's number one ranked under 70 kg armwrestler. He also came in third in the left arm open category despite weighing much lighter than his opponents. Low was again invited to China to compete in the China International Armwrestling Championships 2016. This time the event had more competitors such as Ukraine and Japan to add onto last year's list. He competed in the right arm under 75 kg and left arm under 80 kg categories. He came in 2nd losing out to his rival competitor from China 林伟忠. Low competed in the left hand under 80 kg and placed 6th. In 2019, Low competed in the China International Armwrestling Championships. This is the first time the competition invited international competitors, including Mindaugas Tarasaitis and Joffey Jolly. He ranked 2nd in the left arm category behind Mindaugas Tarasaitis from Lithuania.

World Armwrestling Championships 2015
Low spearheaded the Singapore Armwrestling Team to the 37th World Armwrestling Championships held in Kuala Lumpur, Malaysia. This was Singapore's inaugural participation in the World Armwrestling Championships. Low competed in the Junior under 21 years old, under 70 kg category left and right arm. He placed 11 out of 19 competitors in the left arm category, being defeated by Turkey and Russia while winning Egypt. For the right arm category, he placed 11 out of 22 competitors, winning Turkey and Uzbekistan while being defeated by Russia and Georgia.

Powerlifting - Bench Press
In addition to armwrestling, Valen has competed in raw powerlifting in Singapore, specifically the bench press. At the 2013 Singapore Powerlifting Open, he bench pressed 131 kg at his body weight of 80 kg and ranked second for the bench press in the under 83 kg weight class. As of 2014, his personal best has been bench pressing 150 kg at a body weight of 77 kg. His personal best as of August 2014 was 142.5 kg at a body weight of 74 kg. Valen competed in an unofficial push-pull meet on 27 December 2014, and bench pressed 147.5 kg at a body weight of 72.6 kg, pressing more than 2 times his body weight. Valen competed in an official bench press meet at Elevate gym on 10 July 2016. He pressed a record breaking 157.5 kg at a bodyweight of 74.9 kg. This sets the highest bench only record for the under 75 kg weight class in the history of Singapore.

Media
In October 2014, MediaCorp Channel 5 aired the television series Secret Singapore, which featured Low and his armwrestling team in their profile on armwrestling in Singapore. This was the first time Valen appeared on national television.
On 9 December 2014, he made another media appearance. This time he was being featured on Channel NewsAsia's Singapore Tonight news programme. Channel NewsAsia described Low as 'Singapore youths making waves in niche sports', highlighting his achievements in overseas competitions such as the FitX Armwrestling Cup 2014 and the Asia Armwrestling Championships 2014. The news also discussed the funding challenges he faced in pursuing his armwrestling endeavors. On top of these, he appeared on multiple local and international media. These includes The Royal Singapore, Channel NewsAsia, Harian Metro and South China Times.

Awards

 Malacca Open 2010 – Senior Heavyweight Open 5th
 Malaysia Armsport De Tour Nationals 2011 – Juniors under 19 Open 1st
 Johor Open 2011 - Juniors under 19 Open 1st
 Ipoh Gegaria Armwrestling 2011 – Juniors under 19 years Open 1st
 Ipoh Gegaria Armwrestling 2011 – Senior Heavyweight Open 4th
 Pahang Metro Armwrestling 2011 – Juniors under 19 years Open 1st
 Over Time Armwrestling Johor 2011 – Senior Heavyweight Open 1st
 Mersing Metro Armwrestling 2012 – Senior Middleweight(75–85 kg) 1st
 Terengganu Metro Armwrestling 2012 - Senior Heavyweight Open 3rd
 Malacca Open 2012 – Men's Right Open 1st – Senior Left Open 4th
 Malacca Metro Armwrestling 2012 – Senior Middleweight(75–85 kg) 1st
 MCA Club Cheng Malacca 2012 – Senior Middleweight(75–85 kg) 1st
 Plaza Alam Sentral Armwrestling 2012 – Senior Above 75 kg 1st
 Malacca International Open 2012 – Senior Middleweight(75–85 kg) 1st
 Armwrestling X Challenge Johor 2013 – Senior Above 75 kg 1st
 Spinach and Sports Armwrestling 2013 – Senior Middleweight(75–85 kg) 1st
 Astro Fiesta Armwrestling 2013 – Senior Above 80 kg 3rd
 Malacca Open 2013 – Senior Middleweight(75–85 kg) 1st
 Malacca Invitationals 2013 – Senior Middleweight(75–85 kg) 1st
 Realfitgym Metro Point Open 2013 – Senior Heavyweight Open 1st
 Matic Fest Armwrestling 2013 – Senior Middleweight(75–85 kg) 2nd
 Matic Fest Armwrestling 2013 – Senior Heavyweight Open 3rd
 Infinity Armwrestling Challenge 2013 - Senior Heavyweight Open 3rd
 Shin Min Armwrestling Challenge 2014 – Senior Open 1st
 FitX Armwrestling Cup Australia 2014 – Senior Lightweight 80 kg 1st
 Selangor Armwrestling Championship 2014 – Senior Middleweight(75–85 kg) 1st
 Selangor Armwrestling Championship 2014 – Senior Heavyweight Open 2nd
 Armwrestling Ultimate Challenge 2014 – Senior Middleweight(75–85 kg) 1st
 Armwrestling Ultimate Challenge 2014 – Senior Heavyweight Open 2nd
 Asia Armwrestling Championships 2014 – Youth under 21 years, 65 kg-70 kg left hand 2nd
 Asia Armwrestling Championships 2014 – Youth under 21 years, 65 kg-70 kg right hand 1st
 Pattaya International Armwrestling Championships 2014 - Senior under 75 kg 3rd 
 Pattaya International Armwrestling Championships 2014 - Senior under 85 kg 6th 
 Game of Arms Semenyih 2014 - Senior 75 kg 1st
 Maticfest Open 2014 - Senior Middleweight(75–85 kg) 1st
 Dataran Merdeka Open 2014 - Senior Left 75 kg 1st
 Hulu Langat Armwrestling Competition - Senior Heavyweight Open 1st
 Cheng Malacca Armwrestling Open 2014 - Senior Heavyweight Right Open 1st
 Cheng Malacca Armwrestling Open 2014 - Senior Left Open 1st
 Arnold Classic Australia Armwrestling Cup 2015 - Senior u80 kg 4th
 KIP Mart Tampoi Armwrestling Challenge 2015 - Senior under 75 kg 3rd
 China International Armwrestling Championships 2015 - Senior Under 70 kg 1st
 China International Armwrestling Championships 2015 - Senior Left Open 3rd
 World Armwrestling Championships 2015 - Youth Under 21 years, 65 kg-70 kg Right Hand 11th
 World Armwrestling Championships 2015 - Youth Under 21 years, 65–75 kg Left Hand 11th
 Malaysia Armwars Championships 2015 - Senior 75–85 kg 2nd
 JST Thailand Championships 2015 - Senior 80kg; 4th
 JST Thailand Championships 2015 - Senior Open; 5th
 Johor Open 2015 - Senior 75–85 kg 1st
 Arnold Classic Australia Armwrestling Cup 2016 - Senior Right 80 kg 3rd
 Dataran One Malacca 2016 - Senior Right Above 75 kg 1st
 UMNO Johor Open 2016 - Senior Right Above 80 kg 1st
 Carnival Orang Bersi Mahkota Dewa Johor 2016 - Senior Right Above 75 kg 1st
 Mr Seremban Armwrestling Championship 2016 - Senior Right Above 85 kg 1st
 China International Armwrestling Championships 2016 - Senior Right 75 kg 2nd
 China International Armwrestling Championships 2016 - Senior Left 80 kg 5th
 KIP Mart Tampoi Johor Armwrestling 2016 - Senior Right 75 kg 1st
 Shin Min Armwrestling 2016 - Senior Right Above 70 kg 1st
 Premiere 101 International Open 2017 - Senior Right 75 kg 1st
 Muar International Open 2017 - Senior Right 75 kg; 2nd
 Super 16 Pangolinarms - Senior Open; 2nd
 Shanghai Open 2019 (Spring edition) - Senior Left 78 kg; 1st
 Shanghai Open 2019 (Spring edition)- Senior Right 78 kg; 2nd
 D1 China International Open 2019 - Senior Left 70 kg; 2nd
 D1 China International Open 2019 - Senior Right 70 kg; 6th
 Shanghai Open 2019 (Autumn edition) - Senior Left 70 kg; 1st
 Shanghai Open 2019 (Autumn edition) - Senior Right 70 kg; 3rd
 Singapore Armwrestling National Championships 2021 - Senior Right 63kg; 1st
 Singapore Armwrestling National Championships 2021 - Senior Left 63kg; 1st
 Singapore Armwrestling National Championships 2021 - Senior Right Open; 1st
 Singapore Armwrestling National Championships 2021 - Senior Left Open; 1st
 Over the Top "Down Under" 2022 - Senior Right 70kg; 4th
 Over the Top "Down Under" 2022 - Senior Left 70kg; 1st

Supermatches:'''

 Valen Low vs Joemissie Joe(MAS) 2012 RH (4–1)
 Valen Low vs Jian Jikan(INA) 2013 RH (4–1) 
 Valen Low vs Chung Vui(MAS) 2013 RH (5–0)
 Valen Low vs Joffey Jolly(MAS) 2013 RH (2–1)
 Valen Low vs Jason Tibok(CND) 2014 RH (0-5)
 Valen Low vs Glad Chiang(TWN) 2014 LH (5-0)
 Valen Low Vs Ryan Bowen(AUS) 2015 LH (3-0)
 Valen Low vs Zurab Kavtaradze(NZ) 2016 LH (3-2)
 Valen Low vs 林青弘(Taiwan) 2016 RH (3-0)

References

External links 
 Valen Low's Facebook
 Valen Low Channel News Asia

Living people
Singaporean people of Cantonese descent
Singaporean sportsmen
Male arm wrestlers
1994 births